Staraya Bezginka is a rural locality (a selo) and the administrative center of Starobezginskoye Rural Settlement, Novooskolsky District, Belgorod Oblast, Russia. The population was 671 as of 2010. There are 5 streets.

Geography 
Staraya Bezginka is located 28 km northeast of Novy Oskol (the district's administrative centre) by road. Bolshaya Ivanovka is the nearest rural locality.

References 

Rural localities in Novooskolsky District